Feel the Need may refer to:

 Feel the Need (James "J.T." Taylor album), 1991
 Feel the Need (Leif Garrett album), 1978
 "Feel the Need", single by James "J.T." Taylor from the album of the same name, 1991

See also
 "Feel the Need in Me", a song by The Detroit Emeralds